The Orkney and Shetland by-election was a Parliamentary by-election held on 18–19 November 1902. The constituency returned one Member of Parliament (MP) to the House of Commons of the United Kingdom, elected by the first past the post voting system.

Vacancy
Cathcart Wason had been Liberal Unionist MP for the seat of Orkney and Shetland since 1900. In July 1902, he decided to cross the floor of the House to sit with the Liberal opposition. Leaving the Liberal Unionist Party, he cited Government policy on the army, the Education Bill and the Irish land question. He faced criticism from the Unionists in his constituency and following pressure, he resigned his seat on 7 October 1902 to contest the subsequent by-election.

Electoral history
Since 1885, the seat had been always comfortably returned the Liberal Party candidate. Then the seat was surprisingly gained by Wason; albeit with a narrow majority of forty votes, standing as a Liberal Unionist in 1900.

Candidates

Fifty-four-year-old sitting MP Cathcart Wason chose to fight his seat again, standing as an Independent Liberal. He had hoped to stand as the official Liberal candidate, but the local Liberal Association chose not to back him. Although born in Scotland he moved to New Zealand and had served as an Independent Member of Parliament there. He returned to the UK in 1900 in time for the general election to stand as a Liberal Unionist. His father, Rigby Wason had sat as a Whig MP and his older brother Eugene Wason was at the time a Liberal Party MP in Scotland.
The local Liberal Unionist Association considered several candidates, including Captain John Nicholson, a native of Shetland who had contested Chester-le-Street as a Conservative at the 1900 general election. They eventually selected 59-year-old Theodore Angier as their candidate to defend the seat. He had no connection with the islands and was a member of the Liberal Unionist Council. Angier had formerly been a sailor and owned the family steamship business, having volunteered for service in the South African War as well. He was standing for Parliament for the first time.
In August 1902, the local Liberal Association had selected 47-year-old Thomas McKinnon Wood as their prospective candidate to re-gain the seat.  Although born in Stepney, his father was born in Orkney where he was a farmer. Wood was a member of the London County Council for Central Hackney from 1892 and from 1897 he was leader of the Progressive Party and also served as chairman of the council from 1898 to 1899. Wood stood unsuccessfully as a parliamentary candidate for East Islington in 1895 and Glasgow St. Rollox in 1900.

Campaign
Polling Days were fixed for the 18–19 November 1902, over five weeks after Wason's resignation.

Result
Wason remarkably held his seat, with an increased majority of 411 votes. 

Immediately following his re-election, Wason re-took the Liberal Party whip in the House of Commons.

Aftermath
By the time of the 1906 general election, Wason had been fully integrated with the local Liberal Party and was re-elected as their official candidate;

McKinnon Wood was elected Liberal MP for Glasgow St Rollox at the 1906 general election. Angier was knighted in 1904 and contested unsuccessfully, Gateshead at the 1906 general election.

References

1902 elections in the United Kingdom
1902 in Scotland
1900s elections in Scotland
20th century in Orkney
20th century in Shetland
By-elections to the Parliament of the United Kingdom in Scottish constituencies
Politics of Orkney
Politics of Shetland